Valhallfonna is an ice cap in Ny-Friesland at Spitsbergen, Svalbard. It is located west of Hinlopen Strait and northeast of Åsgardfonna. The glacier covers an area of about 1,000 km2.

See also
List of glaciers in Svalbard
Valhallfonna Formation

References

Glaciers of Spitsbergen